Rob Mathes (born September 10, 1970) is an American record producer, music arranger, composer, songwriter, and performer. He also writes bluesy spiritual-pop music.

Early life
Mathes was born in Boston, Massachusetts, to classical musicians and music instructors Joan and George Mathes. The family moved to Greenwich, Connecticut, where his parents taught music with the local schools and privately. Rob Mathes showed interest and skill in music at a very early age. In his youth, Mathes attended Berklee College of Music where he studied under John Mehegan, a jazz pianist who was a Juilliard faculty member at the time, and later he left Berklee College of Music to study orchestration and counterpoint, privately, under Myron Fink.

Early career
By high school, Mathes was already working regularly as a professional writer and performer in the clubs of nearby New York City. He toured with Chuck Mangione in his early 20s. Mathes then began to focus on writing and arranging in Nashville, and soon was writing songs for Bonnie Raitt, Kathy Mattea, Aaron Neville, Wynonna Judd, Faith Hill, Oleta Adams, Alabama, and Randy Travis.

Producing
Mathes works frequently as a record producer in a wide range of genres.  He has produced the last three Sting albums: Symphonicities, Best of 25 Years, and The Last Ship. Mathes has also produced for many other artists, including Panic! at the Disco, The Young Veins, Beth Hart, Bettye LaVette, Carly Simon, Rod Stewart, Vanessa L. Williams, Michael Cavanaugh, and Melissa Errico.

Arranging and composition
Albums that Mathes is credited for arranging include:
 Genius Loves Company (2004) – Ray Charles
Pretty. Odd. (2008) – Panic at the Disco
 Symphonicities (2010) – Sting
 Save Rock and Roll (2013) – Fall Out Boy
 Too Weird to Live, Too Rare to Die! (2013)  – Panic! at the Disco
 Water in a Whale (2013) – Jillette Johnson
 High Hopes (2014) – Bruce Springsteen
 Pray for the Wicked (2018)  – Panic! at the Disco
 A Celebration of Endings (2020)  – Biffy Clyro
 OK Human (2021) – Weezer

Other artists for whom Mathes has done arranging and composition work include Train, Gin Wigmore, Lou Reed, Bono, Sting, Sade, Lenny Kravitz and Jay-Z, Yo Yo Ma, Eric Clapton, Elton John, Luciano Pavarotti, Boston Pops Orchestra, Tony Bennett, Natalie Cole, Hot Hot Heat, Avril Lavigne, Butch Walker, Renée Fleming, Vanessa Carlton, Bowling for Soup, Evangeline Vournazos, Tim McGraw, Yolanda Adams, George Michael, Celine Dion, Ghostface Killah, Peter Cincotti, Renee Olstead, Lyle Lovett, Ronan Tynan, David Sanborn, Michael McDonald, Eliane Elias, The Cab and The Young Veins.

Solo work
Mathes has also released his own albums, including Evening Train (a cult favorite among artists such as Phil Ramone, Jimmy Webb and Warren Zevon), William the Angel (a Christmas album), Orchestral Songs, Rob Mathes: Beyond the Music (a live broadcast and accompanying sound track), Everywhere, Flesh & Spirit and "Wheelbarrow".

Perhaps best known among his performances are yearly Christmas concerts, which have spawned 2 PBS television specials, Christmas Is Coming: Rob Mathes and Friends (featuring Michael McDonald, David Sanborn, Ossie Davis, and Vanessa L. Williams) and I Want To Hear The Bells, a documentary of his first Christmas concert in 1993. Mathes celebrated 25 years of performing his annual holiday concerts in 2018 with special guests Sting, Vanessa Williams and David Sanborn joining him on stage for a few holiday-themed songs.

Live productions
Mathes' work with The Kennedy Center Honors led to the show We Are One: The Obama Inaugural Celebration at the Lincoln Memorial in 2008, with performances by Beyoncé, Mary J. Blige, Bono, Garth Brooks, Sheryl Crow, Renee Fleming, Josh Groban, Jon Bon Jovi, Herbie Hancock, Heather Headley, John Legend, Jennifer Nettles, John Mellencamp, Usher, Shakira, Bruce Springsteen, James Taylor, will.i.am and Stevie Wonder.

Mathes arranged Renée Fleming's 2014 Super Bowl performance of "The Star-Spangled Banner", recorded by the New Jersey Symphony Orchestra.

He served as Musical Director and orchestrator for the Broadway production of The Last Ship.

Awards and honors
Mathes received the 2012 Emmy in the Outstanding Music Direction category for his work with The Kennedy Center Honors, which airs on CBS each holiday season.

He was nominated for a Tony Award for his orchestration work on the 2014 musical The Last Ship.

See also 
 List of music arrangers

References

1970 births
Living people
Musicians from Greenwich, Connecticut
Record producers from Connecticut
Record producers from Massachusetts
Emmy Award winners
American male pop singers
American music arrangers
Berklee College of Music alumni